Akeley is an unincorporated community in Pine Grove Township, Warren County, Pennsylvania, United States, located at an elevation of 1240 ft (378 m). The community is due north of the similar community of Russell. No population was counted during the 2010 census.

References

Unincorporated communities in Warren County, Pennsylvania
Unincorporated communities in Pennsylvania